Charles Markwood Eckman Jr. (September 10, 1921 – July 3, 1995) was an American basketball head coach and professional basketball referee for the National Basketball Association (NBA). He was also a sports broadcaster.

Early life
Eckman was born in Baltimore, Maryland and graduated from the Baltimore City College high school in 1940. Eckman was a three-sport star as a youngster, excelling in baseball, basketball and track. His father, who was gassed in World War I, died when Charlie was 12 years old; after that he and his mother struggled to make ends meet. Among the odd jobs Eckman did to raise extra money, he officiated basketball games. Baseball was Eckman's primary sport, however, in those days, it was the only professional team sport of any note. He was drafted by the Washington Senators after graduating from Baltimore City College and played in their farm system, but never made it to the majors.

Officiating career
Eckman's career got sidetracked for two years when he enlisted in the US Army Air Forces in late 1943, but he continued to keep his eyes in shape by refereeing the Reserve intramural basketball games. Upon his discharge in 1945, Eckman moved his wife and newborn son to Arizona, where he had been stationed. He continued to officiate basketball games, this time with the American League West Coast, while working for the Phoenix office of the War Assets Administration.

The American Basketball League's Hollywood Shamrocks called in 1947 and hired him to officiate a number of the team's games; two years after that he began refereeing games for the Basketball Association of America. The BAA merged with the National Basketball League in late 1949 and became the National Basketball Association.

Eckman was ranked as one of the top officials in the NBA during his time as a referee, until 1954, when Pistons owner Fred Zollner signed the 32-year-old Eckman to a three-year coaching contract.

Eckman officiated at the first NBA All-Star Game in 1951, and later was the head coach of the Western Conference All-Star teams in 1955, and 1956, becoming the only person to have officiated and coached in an NBA All-Star Game.

In 1967, after 29 years and over 3,500 collegiate and professional basketball games, Eckman, announced his retirement from officiating, after experiencing leg problems. Eckman is the only person to have ever officiated the NIT, NCAA and NBA Finals games.

Coaching career
During his first year as head coach, the Pistons finished with a 43–29 record, and first place in the Western Division. During the 1955 NBA Finals, the Pistons lost a hard-fought seven-game to the Syracuse Nationals. The first-year head coach was honored as NBA Coach of the Year.  The following season, Eckman led the Pistons to another trip to the NBA Finals, where the Pistons fell to the Philadelphia Warriors, 4–1. In his third season as head coach, Eckman led the Pistons to the playoffs, where they lost to the Minneapolis Lakers in the semifinals. During the 1957–58 season, the Pistons relocated from Fort Wayne, Indiana to Detroit, Michigan. Unfortunately for Eckman, his stay in Detroit didn't last long. He was relieved of his coaching duties just 25 games into the season following a 9–16 start. Eckman's overall coaching record was 123–118. He eventually returned to officiating.

Broadcasting career
Eckman began working as a sportscaster on the radio in 1961 with "The voice of the Chesapeake Bay." Later in 1965, Charley accepted a position as sportscaster for WCBM and WFBR. Eckman became an award-winning radio sportscaster, handling color commentary for the Baltimore Bullets, Orioles and Colts.

Death
On July 3, 1995, Eckman died of colon cancer, at the age of 73.

References

Further reading
 Charley Eckman and Fred Neil,  It's a Very Simple Game! The Life and Times of Charley Eckman, Borderlands Press (1995), 
 Rand Hooper, "Charley Eckman's Rise Basketball's Top Story", The Christian Science Monitor, April 8, 1955, p. 11.

1921 births
1995 deaths
American radio sports announcers
Baltimore City College alumni
Basketball coaches from Maryland
Deaths from colorectal cancer
Detroit Pistons head coaches
Fort Wayne Pistons head coaches
National Basketball Association broadcasters
National Basketball Association referees
Sportspeople from Baltimore
United States Army Air Forces personnel of World War II